Eduard Uvíra (born July 12, 1961, in Opava, Czechoslovakia) is an ice hockey player who played for the Czechoslovak national team. He won a silver medal at the 1984 Winter Olympics.

Career statistics

Regular season and playoffs

International

References

External links

1961 births
Czech ice hockey defencemen
Czechoslovak ice hockey defencemen
HC Dukla Jihlava players
HC Litvínov players
HC Slovan Bratislava players
Ice hockey players at the 1984 Winter Olympics
Ice hockey players at the 1988 Winter Olympics
Living people
Medalists at the 1984 Winter Olympics
Olympic ice hockey players of Czechoslovakia
Olympic medalists in ice hockey
Olympic silver medalists for Czechoslovakia
Sportspeople from Opava
Toronto Maple Leafs draft picks
Czechoslovak expatriate sportspeople in Germany
Czechoslovak expatriate ice hockey people
Czech expatriate ice hockey players in Germany
Naturalized citizens of Germany
German ice hockey coaches
Czech ice hockey coaches